Take The Stage is a non-scripted singing competition starring Johnny Wright and Rodney "Darkchild" Jerkins, and produced by YOBI.tv.

Take The Stage has been likened to shows such as American Idol, The Voice, and X Factor in that the contestants are put through a variety of challenges to see who has what it takes to be the next musical sensation. It has also, however, been noted as different from these shows for its non-reliance on professional or celebrity judges and the absence of progressive eliminations, as well as for its focus on original music.

The winner of Take The Stage will be determined solely by viewer votes and will get $20,000 and a music management contract with Johnny Wright and YOBI.tv. Take The Stage was seen on YOBI.tv and on Myspace.

Stars and Guest Stars
Take The Stage stars a number of music industry, media, and visual arts experts. 
 Johnny Wright - Music Manager
 Rodney "Darkchild" Jerkins - Songwriter and Producer
 Michael McCoy - Program Director, Clear Channel Communications
 Adrienne Williams - Marketing Manager, Live Nation
 LeeAundra Keany - Professional Media Trainer, Keany Communications
 Abrey Adams Watterson - Professional Photographer
 Tim Smith - Recording, Mixing Engineer - The Soundscape Recording Studio

Featured Musicians
The nine musicians featured on Take The Stage earned their way onto the show by winning the YOBI.tv Season 4 YOBISing contest.

 Ashlyn Metheny
 Brooklynn Jayde
 Gabrielle Taryn
 Katelyn Krapf
 Luke James
 Marquisa DeShawn
 Mykell
 Teri "Lyric" Green
 Tyler Howe

Production
Take The Stage was filmed in late March and early June 2012 at a number of locations around the Detroit metropolitan area.

Episodes
Episode titles, descriptions, and release dates are from the Take The Stage IMDb page.

 Episode 1 - Meet the Finalists. Release date, 5 June 2012

 Episode 2 - Fitness 101 Challenge. Release date, 12 June 2012
 
Episode 3 - Here's Johnny! Release date, 19 June 2012
 
Episode 4 - Wright Moves. Release date, 26 June 2012
 
Episode 5 - Star Spangled. Release date, 3 July 2012
 
Episode 6 - Style and Image Challenge. Release date, 10 July 2012
 
Episode 7 - Sell It ~ Record Producer Meeting. Release date, 17 July 2012
 
Episode 8 - Jingles ~ Overnight Challenge. Release date, 24 July 2012
 
Episode 9 - Strike a Pose. Release date, 31 July 2012
 
Episode 10 - Radio Ready Challenge. Release date, 7 August 2012
 
Episode 11 - Sold Out!. Release date, 14 August 2012

Episode 12 - Meet the Press. Release date, 21 August 2012

Episode 13 - Live, from the Green Tile! Release date, 28 August 2012

Episode 14 - Rodney "Darkchild" Jerkins Original Song Challenge ~ Part One. Release date, 4 September 2012

Episode 15 - Rodney "Darkchild" Jerkins Original Song Challenge ~ Part Two. Release date, 11 September 2012

Episode 16 - Dress Rehearsal. Release date, 18 September 2012

Episode 17 - Final Performances. Release date, 25 September 2012

Episode 18 - Live Results Finale. Release date, 7 October 2012

Original songs
Each Take The Stage artist has five original songs on the official series websites.

Results and Prizes
The series finale was broadcast live via Ustream on October 7, 2012. The show featured Johnny Wright and all nine of the Take The Stage artists, as well as special guest Rodney "Darkchild" Jerkins. Those results and the prizes won by each artist are as follows:

First Place - Katelyn Krapf 
$20,000 and a music management contract with Johnny Wright's Wright Entertainment Group and YOBI.tv

Second Place - Gabrielle Taryn 
$8,000 and "Scars" (a collaboration with Teri "Lyric" Green) will be shopped around to record labels

Third Place - Luke James 
$7,000 and studio time with Rodney "Darkchild" Jerkins

Fourth Place - Teri "Lyric" Green 
$5,000 and Scars" (a collaboration with Gabrielle Taryn) will be shopped around to record labels

Fifth Place - Ashlyn Metheny 
$4,000

Sixth Place - Mykell 
$3,000

Seventh Place - Brooklynn Jayde 
$2,000

Eighth Place - Tyler Howe 
$2,000

Ninth Place - Marquisa DeShawn 
$2,000

References

External links
 Take The Stage website
 

Talent shows
Music competitions in the United States